Iteomyia major is a gall midge which forms galls on willows (Salix species). It was first described by Jean-Jacques Kieffer in 1889.

Description of the gall
The gall is a coalesced group of 2–10 hard round galls, on the midrib or side vein and are equally prominent on either side of the leaf. Each gall has a single larva, initially white and later orange or red. There is a single generation each year and pupation takes place in the soil. Females prefer to lay their eggs on the ″broad-leaf willows″ and the galls are found on sallows, or their hybrids, which include bay willow (S. pentandra), bitter willow (S. elaeagnos), dark-leaved willow (S. myrsinifolia), eared willow (S. aurita), goat willow (S. caprea), gray willow (S. glauca), grey willow ([[Salix cinerea|S. cinerea]]), purple willow (S. purpurea), tea-leaved willow (S. phylicifolia) and woolly willow (S. lanata).

Similar speciesIteomyia capreae'' galls are small, hard, green pouches, up to 4 mm in diameter and, as they mature, have a reddish or purplish tinge. They are not as prominent on the lower leaf surface, having red-rimmed conical pores.

Distribution
Recorded from Great Britain (England, Scotland and Wales) and the Netherlands.

References

External links
 Nature spot
 

Cecidomyiidae
Nematoceran flies of Europe
Gall-inducing insects
Insects described in 1889
Taxa named by Jean-Jacques Kieffer
Willow galls